Nagoba Jatara is a Hindu tribal festival held in a Keslapur village, Inderavelly Mandal Adilabad district, Telangana, India. It is the second biggest tribal carnival and celebrated by Mesaram clan of  Gond&Pardhan tribes for 10 days. Tribal people from Maharashtra, Chhattisgarh, Orissa and Madhya Pradesh belonging to the Mesram clan offer prayers at the festival.

Thousands of Tribal people from Maharashtra, Chhattisgarh, Odisha, Karnataka, Jharkhand and Madhya Pradesh belonging to the Mesaram clan offer prayers at the festival Nagoba. It starts in Pushya Masam, Hindu lunar month. A ceremony of 'bheting' is its integral part where the new brides are introduced to the clan god during first jatra after their marriage.

How To Travel
To reach Nagoba Jatara from Adilabad district center distance is of 32 km.
From Hyderabad 326 km, Karimnagar 183 km, Warangal 235 km

References

External links
 Telangana Jatara Updates

Adilabad district